Zdeněk Kolář and Luis David Martínez were the defending champions but only Martínez chose to defend his title, partnering Fabien Reboul. Martínez lost in the semifinals to Ivan and Matej Sabanov.

Marco Bortolotti and Sergio Martos Gornés won the title after defeating Sabanov and Sabanov 6–4, 6–4 in the final.

Seeds

Draw

References

External links
 Main draw

San Marino Open - Doubles
2022 Doubles